Col des Planches (el. 1411 m.) is a high mountain pass in the Alps in the canton of Valais in Switzerland. The road to the Col runs from Martigny at 471m with an average gradient of about 9%, over Col des Planches then down to Sembrancher at 717m with an average gradient of 7%

See also
 List of highest paved roads in Europe
 List of mountain passes

Planches
Planches